Louder Than Live is a home video by the American rock band Soundgarden, featuring songs performed live at the Whisky a Go Go in Los Angeles, California on December 7 and 10, 1989. It was directed by Kevin Kerslake, and released on May 22, 1990.

Overview
Louder Than Live features five live tracks filmed during the Louder Than Love tour, namely, "Get on the Snake", "Gun", "I Awake", "Big Dumb Sex", and a medley of Spinal Tap's "Big Bottom" and Cheech & Chong's "Earache My Eye", with footage from both concerts mixed together. The home video also includes the previously released music videos for the songs "Loud Love" and "Hands All Over", both also directed by Kerslake. Is on this release that frontman Chris Cornell is seen wearing silver duct tape shorts. The bassist for these performances was Jason Everman. AllMusic gave it two and a half out of a possible five stars. AllMusic staff writer Greg Prato said that "for fans of early Soundgarden, Louder Than Live is still recommended." Louder Than Live was released on VHS only, with no official DVD version available.

In addition to the home video, A&M Records released a promotional mini-album, featuring the same title, in CD format (May 1990) and on 12" blue translucent vinyl (July 1990). The CD came in a thick cardboard packaging wrapped in silvery gray duct tape, and labeled with a yellow sticker that reads "Soundgarden: Louder Than Live! at the Whisky" with uppercase black letters. In addition to the five live tracks from the video, the CD includes the songs "Beyond the Wheel" and "Hunted Down", while the vinyl disc includes all the live tracks from the video in addition to "Beyond the Wheel". This album has been bootlegged on black vinyl; genuine copies can be distinguished by the A&M logo.

Track listing

Promotional CD

Promotional 12" vinyl disc

These recordings were also temporarily available for streaming under the title "Gun (Recorded live at Whisky a Go Go 1990)" through the music service Spotify.

Personnel
Soundgarden
Matt Cameron – drums
Chris Cornell – lead vocals, rhythm guitar
Jason Everman – bass
Kim Thayil – lead guitar

Production
Kevin Kerslake – film director

Additional editing by Mark Miremont

Chart positions

References

External links

Soundgarden video albums
1990 live albums
1990 video albums
Live video albums
Albums recorded at the Whisky a Go Go
Soundgarden live albums
A&M Records live albums
A&M Records video albums